Pōhakuloa Training Area (PTA) is a US military training base located on the high plateau between Mauna Loa, Mauna Kea and the Hualālai volcanic mountains of the island of Hawaii. It includes a small military airstrip known as Bradshaw Army Airfield.

Description
The region was used for live fire exercises in 1943 during World War II when Camp Tarawa temporarily held troops on Parker Ranch.
About  were leased from Richard Smart, owner of the ranch.
At that time it was called the Waikoloa Maneuver Area, and located northwest of current base, south of Waimea. In September 1946 the land used for the old maneuver area and camp was returned to the ranch, and a smaller Lalamilo Firing Range used until 1953. Since coastal areas were developed into tourist resorts, military areas were moved inland to more remote locations.

Location
The name of the current facility comes from puu pōhaku loa, which means "long rocky cinder cone" in the Hawaiian Language, although like many other Hawaiian names, the same name has been used for other places on the island.
The training area is about midway between Hilo, on the east coast and the Army landing site at Kawaihae Harbor.
It is used by both the U.S. Army and Marine Corps.

The only road access is via the Saddle Road (Hawaii Route 200), which is paralleled by a tank trail.
Because of this remoteness, the area is used mostly for short training sessions.

Facilities

The barracks for about 2,000 troops were constructed in April 1955 from prefabricated buildings used in World War II.
The support area includes  of logistic and administrative facilities.
In July 2006 an additional  were purchased from Parker Ranch in an area known as Keʻāmuku,
which means "cut-off lava" in Hawaiian, from to the 19th century lava flows through the area.
PTA has a  impact area used for bombing and gunnery practice, refurbished in March 2009 to allow helicopter training.
Its remoteness allows a wide range of weapons to be used.
The 25th Infantry Division and 3rd Marine Regiment often use the base for four to six-week training periods.

Environmental problems
Weapons such as the Davy Crockett nuclear rifle with dummy warheads and depleted Uranium have been used at PTA.

After initial denials, an investigation concluded that spotting rounds were used in the 1960s.
Measurements detected radiation, but reportedly not above life-threatening levels.

Two Native Hawaiians were suing the Department of Land and Natural Resources, saying the state has breached its duty to protect ceded lands at the Pohakuloa Training Area.

Bradshaw Army Airfield

The airstrip was constructed at the area from 1955 to 1956 and dedicated Aug of 1957, by the then Commanding General of the 25th Inf. Div. Fog often restricts helicopters, which can also fly in from the larger bases on Oahu.

Environment
Vegetation varies from sparse grassland and low shrubs to open māmane forest. Despite the volcanic terrain, some of the areas contain protected wildlife. Within the borders of the training area, ten different endangered species can be found. These include the native Hawaiian mint honohono (Haplostachys haplostachya) and the shrub 'kio'ele (Kadua coriacea). This area has more endangered species than any other US Army installation. The northeastern portion of the site near Mauna Kea provides habitat for the endangered bird Palila (Loxioides bailleui), for example.

Several archaeological sites have been found in the training area, including the Bobcat Trail Habitation Cave, listed in the National Register of Historic Places.
To reduce fire danger and damage from feral goats, areas were fenced.

See also
 Hawaii World War II Army Airfields

References

External links

Installations of the United States Army
Buildings and structures in Hawaii County, Hawaii
Military installations in Hawaii